Leones Airport  is an airport on the northwest shore of General Carrera Lake in the Aysén Region of Chile.

There is mountainous terrain west of the runway.

See also

Transport in Chile
List of airports in Chile

References

External links
OpenStreetMap - Leones
OurAirports - Leones
FallingRain - Leones Airport

Airports in Chile
Airports in Aysén Region